

See also

Lists of fossiliferous stratigraphic units in Europe
Lists of fossiliferous stratigraphic units in the United Kingdom

References
 

Northern Ireland
United Kingdom geology-related lists
Geography of Northern Ireland